Allie Esiri (born 26 January 1967), née Allison Byrne, is a British writer and former stage, film, and television actress.

She created iF Poems, an educational poetry app, the accompanying hardback anthology iF: A Treasury of Poems for Almost Every Possibility, and The Love Book, an interactive literary app on iOS. Esiri's anthology, published by Pan Macmillan on 8 September 2016, A Poem for Every Night of the Year won the IBW Book award 2017. Her anthologies have been picked as best books of the year in the Observer, New Statesman and The Times.

Esiri's anthology, A Poem for Every Day of the Year was published in hardback and audiobook by Pan Macmillan on 7 September 2017, Shakespeare for Every Day of the Year was published in hardback, e-book and audiobook by Pan Macmillan UK in September 2019 and by Penguin in October 2020 in the United States. A Poet for Every Day of the Year was published in hardback, e-book and audiobook by Pan Macmillan UK in September 2021.

Acting career
Daughter of actor Michael Byrne, Esiri read Modern and Medieval Languages at St Catharine's College, Cambridge, where she appeared in numerous productions, including The Winter's Tale directed by Tim Supple and an acclaimed production of Cyrano de Bergerac, directed by Sam Mendes, starring Tom Hollander and which also featured future politician Nick Clegg. Byrne's first major television role was in the Agatha Christie's Poirot adaptation of The Mysterious Affair at Styles in 1990.  In 1992 she played  Olivia in an English Shakespeare Company production of Twelfth Night directed by Michael Pennington. She later appeared in episodes of The Bill, Goodnight Sweetheart, Men Behaving Badly, A Touch of Frost and Van der Valk.

In 1995, she played Lady Kiely in the television movie Sharpe's Battle, alongside Sean Bean and Hugh Fraser, with whom she had previously appeared in the Agatha Christie's Poirot adaptation of The Mysterious Affair at Styles. She played one of the lead parts in the ITV series Call Red (1996). She also appeared in the Merchant Ivory Productions film, Howard's End and the Kenneth Branagh film In the Bleak Midwinter.  In 1999 she played Teri Riley in the film Doomwatch: Winter Angel. Other acting credits include Dr Faustus at Greenwich Theatre and Macbeth directed by Michael Bogdanov for the English Shakespeare Company.

Literary career
Byrne stopped acting in 1999 and wrote freelance articles for publications such as American Vogue, The New York Times, and London's Evening Standard ES magazine, and now works in the world of poetry and technology. Under her married name of Allie Esiri she has co-created the successful poetry app, "iF Poems" and edited the hardback anthology "iF, A Treasury of Poems for Almost Every Possibility". she conceived  "iF Poems" as an educational poetry app for children of any age. It was chosen to be in The Sunday Times Best 500 Apps of the year list and in The Spectator's top ten ibooks of the year. It runs on the IOS platform for iPad, iPhone and iPod Touch. Poems are read aloud on the app by Helena Bonham Carter, Bill Nighy, Harry Enfield, and Tom Hiddleston. The apps and the book are illustrated by Natasha Law.

Esiri has also created "The Love Book App" recommended by Apple and available on both Android and iOS platforms. It has 300 poems, quotes, letters and short stories on the theme of love, read by Helena Bonham Carter, Emma Watson, Damian Lewis, Tom Hiddleston, Helen McCrory and Gina Bellman. The app is illustrated by Kate Moross. There is a hardback book of The Love Book, edited by Esiri, published by Square Peg, an imprint of Random House on 6 February 2014. A new hardback anthology, "A Poem For Every Night of the Year", compiled by and with introductory paragraphs by Esiri, was published by Macmillan Children's Books in September 2016. In June 2017, it won the IBW 2017, Best Children's Book at the Independent Bookshop Book Awards and it was the top selling new poetry title of 2016.

Esiri has created poetry shows with readers including Damian Lewis, Helen McCrory, Samuel West, Dominic West, Helena Bonham Carter, Tobias Menzies, Giles Terera, Tamsin Greig and Sophie Turner. "A Poem for Every Night of the Year" had a launch event show at the National Theatre on the Olivier stage on 25 November 2016. It was reviewed in The Telegraph. Esiri hosted the show and poems were read by Samuel West, Hattie Morahan, Giles Terera and Kate Duchene. Esiri curated and hosted similar events at the Hay Festival, Cheltenham Literature Festival, Edinburgh Festival, Oxford Literary Festival and Bath Festivals with Tony Robinson, Sophie Turner, Ronni Ancona, Alexander Armstrong, Beatie Edney, Damian Lewis, Helen McCrory, Gina Bellman, Hugh Ross, Nathaniel Parker, Sanjeev Bhaskar, Alison Steadman, Samuel West and Harry Enfield.

Esiri's latest anthology, A Poem for Every Day of the Year was published by Macmillan on 7 September 2017. The Guardian recently chose it as one of their top ten poetry books and it was chosen by the chair of the National Trust as the book she would take her to her desert island on Desert Island Discs. A Poem for Every Day of the Year show at the National Theatre took place on 10 November 2017 - joining Esiri on stage were actors Adjoa Andoh, Simon Russell Beale, Joanna Lumley, Stephen Mangan, Helen McCrory and Samuel West. A Poem for Every Day of the Year was in The Observer, the Times and the New Statesmen books of the year. The audiobook is read by Helena Bonham Carter and Simon Russell Beale.

Esiri curated and hosted an event, Women Poets Through the Ages in November 2018 at the National Theatre with Joanna Lumley, Helen McCrory, Kate Fleetwood, Sheila Atim and Indira Varma. And then again at the Bridge theatre in London in April 2019 with Helena Bonham Carter, Helen McCrory and Pippa Bennett-Warner.

Esiri's next collection, "Shakespeare for Every Day of the Year" was published in the UK and America and is available in hardback, e-book and audiobook. The readers for the audiobook include Damian Lewis, Helen McCrory, Paapa Essiedu and Simon Russell Beale and it was the Audiobook Pick of the Week in The Times. The accompanying live shows have featured Diana Quick, Paapa Essiedu and Christopher Eccleston and a film, available on YouTube recorded  during the lockdown for the Hay Festival starring Helena Bonham Carter and Dominic West, introduced by Esiri.

The latest anthology is A Poet for Every Day of the Year, published by Macmillan in September 2021. The show at the National Theatre was dedicated to long-term collaborator Helen McCrory and was curated by Esiri and hosted by Damian Lewis. It’s available to stream free on National Theatre YouTube.

Esiri sat on the advisory board of The Times/The Sunday Times Cheltenham Literature Festival 2014–2106, currently sits on the Children's Poetry Summit and is an advisor to the organisation National Poetry Day. She chaired the literary themed Secret Winter Gala for the charity Save the Children from 2013–2015 and chaired the judging panel for the CLPE poetry prize 2021.

Personal life
She is married to Mark Esiri, a partner in Venrex Investment Management, which he co-founded. They have three children.

Selected television credits
Doomwatch: Winter Angel (1999) - as Teri Riley
The Bill - as D.S. Hunt (1998)
Goodnight Sweetheart 1 episode - as Kate (1997)
Call Red - many episodes, as Alyson Butler (1996)
Men Behaving Badly 1 episode - as Jill (1995)
Sharpe's Battle - as Lady Kiely (1995) 
A Touch of Frost - as Ruth Ormrod (1995)
Van der Valk, The Ties That Bind - as Petra van Leurink (1992)
Minder The Loneliness Of The Long Distance Entrepreneur and Three Cons Make A Mountain - as Lucy (1991)
Agatha Christie's Poirot - The Mysterious Affair at Styles - Cynthia Murdoch (1990)

References

The Telegraph review of The National Theatre's A Poem for Every Day of the Year 
The Telegraph review of The National Theatre's A Poem for Every Night of the Year 
Sunday Times magazine, Allie Esiri 'How does it feel to pick a poem for Christmas' 
Damian Lewis and Helen McCrory read poems from The Love Book at Cheltenham Literature Festival for Allie Esiri in The Times 
The Times on Allie Esiri and her iF Poems app 
Allie Esiri presents 30 Great Poems Everyone Should Know in The Times 
Allie Esiri in the Sunday Times, 'Rhyme or Reason' 
A Poem for Every Day of the Year and A Poem for Every Night of the Year in The Guardian's top ten poetry anthologies 
The Guardian podcast with Allie Esiri on poetry 
A Poem for Every Night of the Year in The Observer's best books 2016 
The Guardian's best children's books for 2018 of all ages 
Allie Esiri on BBC Radio 2 Radcliffe and marconi show 
Allie Esiri on Cerys Matthew's BBC radio show 
Allie Esiri interview, 'The Books that Changed my Life' 
Allie Esiri interview on BBC Robert Elms 
The Love Book app created by Allie Esiri with Tom Hiddleston in the Telegraph

External links

1967 births
Alumni of St Catharine's College, Cambridge
English television actresses
English film actresses
Living people
20th-century English actresses